Mustapha Yahaya (born 9 January 1994) is a Ghanaian footballer who plays as a midfielder for Lincoln Red Imps.

Career

Early career 
Yahaya started his career in Ghana before moving to join FC Twente youth side Jong FC Twente. He played in the U-19 before being promoted to the U-21 side.

Europa FC 
In July 2016, Yahaya joined Gibraltar-side Europa FC on a free transfer. On 14 July 2016, he made his debut in the UEFA Europa League, playing the full 90 minutes in a 1–0 loss to AIK Fotboll. He also played the full 90 minutes in the return leg on 21 July 2017, which ended in the same 1–0 scoreline as the first leg. On 26 June 2017, he played the full 90 minutes in the UEFA Champions league knockout match against The New Saints F.C. which ended in a 2–1 victory for his club. He also played the full time in the return leg on 4 July 2017, with the match ending in a 1–3 loss culminating to a 3–4 on aggregate ending their campaign at 1st qualifying round.

Lincoln Red Imps 
In August 2019, he joined fellow Gibraltar-side Lincoln Red Imps. On 27 August 2020, he featured in the club's UEFA Europa League campaign match against Union Titus Pétange, and scored the second goal in the 95th minute of added time to help push the club to a 2–0 victory and help them qualify for the next round of the competition. He played the full 90 minutes in the club's 5–0 loss to Rangers on 17 September 2019, ending their run in the competition.

Honours 
Europa

 Gibraltar Premier Division: 2016–17
 Rock Cup: 2016–17, 2017–18, 2019
Pepe Reyes Cup: 2018
Lincoln Red Imps

Gibraltar Premier Division: 2020–21, 2021–22, 2022–23
 Rock Cup: 2021, 2021–22
 Pepe Reyes Cup: 2022
Individual

 Gibraltar Premier Division Midfielder of the Season: 2018–19

References

External links 

 
 
Mustapha Yahaya – UEFA Europa league
Mustapha Yahaya – UEFA Champions league

Living people
1994 births
Association football midfielders
Ghanaian footballers
Europa F.C. players
Lincoln Red Imps F.C. players
FC Twente players
Ghanaian expatriate footballers
Expatriate footballers in the Netherlands
Ghanaian expatriate sportspeople in the Netherlands
Footballers from Kumasi
Expatriate footballers in Gibraltar
Ghanaian expatriate sportspeople in Gibraltar
Gibraltar National League players
Ghana A' international footballers
2014 African Nations Championship players
Jong FC Twente players